TUIL Arena is an association football venue located in Tromsø, Norway, Opened in 1983, it is the home ground of Tromsdalen UIL, which plays in the First Division. The pitch is owned by the club and has artificial turf. It will be superseded by TUIL Arena that is planned to open in 2010. The field has also been used by Tromsø IL for Premier League games. The attendance record is 3,200 people who attended a match between Tromsdalen and Bodø/Glimt in 1992.

Located next to the stadium is an artificial long track speed skating oval also called Tromsdalen Kunstisbane.

External links
 TUIL Arena - Nordic Stadiums

References

Football venues in Norway
Eliteserien venues
Sport in Tromsø
Buildings and structures in Tromsø
Speed skating venues in Norway
1983 establishments in Norway
Sports venues completed in 1983
Sports venues in Troms og Finnmark